The 12th Los Angeles Film Critics Association Awards were announced on 13 December 1986 and given on 29 January 1987.

Winners
Best Picture:
Hannah and Her Sisters
Runner-up: Blue Velvet

Best Director:
David Lynch – Blue Velvet
Runner-up: Woody Allen – Hannah and Her Sisters

Best Actor:
Bob Hoskins – Mona Lisa
Runner-up: Dexter Gordon – Round Midnight

Best Actress:
Sandrine Bonnaire – Vagabond (Sans toit ni loi)
Runner-up: Marlee Matlin – Children of a Lesser God

Best Supporting Actor:
Dennis Hopper – Blue Velvet and Hoosiers
Runner-up: Michael Caine – Hannah and Her Sisters

Best Supporting Actress (tie):
Cathy Tyson – Mona Lisa
Dianne Wiest – Hannah and Her Sisters

Best Screenplay:
Woody Allen - Hannah and Her Sisters
Runner-up: David Lynch – Blue Velvet

Best Cinematography:
Chris Menges – The Mission
Runner-up: Bruno de Keyzer - Round Midnight

Best Music Score:
Herbie Hancock and Dexter Gordon – Round Midnight
Runner-up: Ennio Morricone - The Mission

Best Foreign Film:
Vagabond (Sans toit ni loi) • France
Runner-up: My Beautiful Laundrette • UK

Experimental/Independent Film/Video Award (tie):
Jonas Mekas – He Stands in the Desert Counting the Seconds of His Life
Nina Menkes – Magdalena Viraga 

New Generation Award:
Spike Lee – She's Gotta Have It

Career Achievement Award:
John Cassavetes

Special Citation:
Precious Images
Rafigh Pooya

References

External links
12th Annual Los Angeles Film Critics Association Awards

1986
Los Angeles Film Critics Association Awards
Los Angeles Film Critics Association Awards
Los Angeles Film Critics Association Awards
Los Angeles Film Critics Association Awards